Tasuja Oja (born Benedikt Oskar Oja; 5 August 1888, in Kuivajõe – 1946, in Leningrad Oblast, Russia) was an Estonian politician, civil servant and educator. He was a member of the II and III Riigikogu, representing the Estonian Labour Party. He was a member of the Riigikogu since 18 July 1923. He replaced Arnold Schulbach.

Oja was arrested by the Soviet occupation authorities on 9 December 1944 in Rannamõisa where he was employed as a schoolmaster. He was sentenced to seven years imprisonment. He died in 1946 in prison custody in Leningrad Oblast in 1946.

References

1888 births
1946 deaths
People from Kose Parish
People from Kreis Harrien
Estonian Labour Party politicians
Members of the Riigikogu, 1923–1926
Members of the Riigikogu, 1926–1929
Estonian civil servants
Russian military personnel of World War I
Recipients of the Military Order of the Cross of the Eagle, Class V
Estonian people who died in prison custody
Estonian people who died in Soviet detention